Mario Thyer (born September 29, 1966) is a Canadian former professional ice hockey player who played five regular season games in the National Hockey League (NHL) with the Minnesota North Stars during the 1989–90 season. The rest of his career, which lasted from 1989 to 1994, was mainly spent in the minor International Hockey League.

Career statistics

Regular season and playoffs

Awards and honors

References

External links

1966 births
Living people
Binghamton Rangers players
Canadian ice hockey centres
Cincinnati Cyclones (IHL) players
Essen Mosquitoes players
Kalamazoo Wings (1974–2000) players
Minnesota North Stars players
New England Stingers players
Portland Pirates players
Ice hockey people from Montreal
Undrafted National Hockey League players